Christian Haase (born 6 May 1966) is a German politician of the Christian Democratic Union (CDU) who has been serving as a member of the Bundestag from the state of North Rhine-Westphalia since 2013.

Political career 
Haase became a member of the Bundestag in the 2013 German federal election, representing the Höxter and Lippe districts. He is a member of the Budget Committee and its Subcommittee on European Affairs. Since the 2021 elections, Haase has been serving as his parliamentary group’s spokesperson for the national budget. In 2022, he also joined the parliamentary body charged with overseeing a 100 billion euro special fund to strengthen Germany’s armed forces. 

In addition to his committee assignments, Haase chairs the German-Egyptian Parliamentary Friendship Group and is a member of the German Parliamentary Friendship Group for Relations with the Northern Adriatic States.

Political positions 
In June 2017, Haase voted against Germany's introduction of same-sex marriage.

Ahead of the Christian Democrats’ leadership election in 2018, Haase publicly endorsed Annegret Kramp-Karrenbauer to succeed Angela Merkel as the party’s chair.

References

External links 

  
 Bundestag biography 

1966 births
Living people
Members of the Bundestag for North Rhine-Westphalia
Members of the Bundestag 2021–2025
Members of the Bundestag 2017–2021
Members of the Bundestag 2013–2017
Members of the Bundestag for the Christian Democratic Union of Germany